Charles Beauclerk Gaynor (born April 3, 1907, Boston, Massachusetts – December 18, 1975, Washington, D.C.) was an American musical composer. His revues include Lend an Ear (1948) and Show Girl (1961), and he contributed songs to the 1973 revival of Irene, and the London production Sweeter and Lower.

Gene Kelly had his first position as a choreographer with the Charles Gaynor musical revue Hold Your Hats at the Pittsburgh Playhouse in April 1938.

References

1907 births
1975 deaths
American male composers
American composers
People from Winthrop, Massachusetts
Musicians from Massachusetts
20th-century American male musicians